Trial des Nations is the most important Motorcycle trials competition of national teams organized by the International Motorcycling Federation (FIM). After the experiment of Myslenice, Poland, the first official trial of Nations was held in Canzo, Italy, and managed by the Moto Club Canzo. The Italian club also proposed to maintain this event as a yearly competition. Since then, it has been held annually at different countries. Each team is composed of four riders in the male category, and since 2000, three riders in the female category. The team with fewest total penalties is awarded the title.  An Indoor Trial des Nations championship was also disputed during 7 years, from 2002 to 2008, and was restarted again in 2012 with the new name FIM X-trial des nations.

The FIM made a significant change in 1995. They recognized that they could not grow the sport having only a single-competition class structure, given that most entrants were not professional trials riders. The FIM added a second, class called the “B” class, or "International", with the “A” class being intended for the top teams of the world. There are typically 5 countries entered in the prestigious “A” class, and about 15 countries in the “B” class.

The competition has been dominated by Spain winning 21 out of 31 tournaments in male category.

Winners

Titles per country (male)
As of September 2022, the following ranking shows the countries with most Trial des Nations wins, in male category:

Titles per country (female)
As of September 2022, the following ranking shows the countries with most Trial des Nations wins, in female category:

References

External links 
 FIM Trial des Nations
 FIM X-Trial des Nations (indoor)

Motorcycle trials
World motorcycle racing series
Fédération Internationale de Motocyclisme